The 2005 UEFA–CAF Meridian Cup was the fifth UEFA–CAF Meridian Cup. It was held on 4–11 February in Turkey. The top four under-18 teams from Europe and Africa played in Kuşadası, Söke, Aydın and Ödemiş in the Aegean Region.

Teams

  (host nation)

Standings

Results

References

External links
2005: Europe extend Meridian domination

UEFA–CAF Meridian Cup
Meridan
European 2005
Mer
Sport in Aydın
U
2004–05 in Turkish football